The Mercedes-Benz O302 was a coach chassis manufactured by Mercedes-Benz between 1965 and 1974.

History
The Mercedes-Benz O302 was launched in May 1965 as a replacement for the O321. It was manufactured by Mercedes-Benz's Mannheim plant. Its body was designed to an austere Bauhaus style. The O302 was sold as both a chassis and as an integral bus with Mercedes-Benz supplying the body.

Over 32,000 O302s were built over an eleven-year period, most as coaches but some were built as buses. It was superseded by the O303.

OTOMARSAN derived O302T from O302 and O305. Most appealing difference is box-shaped chassis and stronger engine.

For the 1974 FIFA World Cup in West Germany, each team was transported in a coach painted in the team's colours.

References

External links

O302
Vehicles introduced in 1965
1974 FIFA World Cup
Coaches (bus)